Pterygoneurum is a genus of mosses belonging to the family Pottiaceae.

The genus has cosmopolitan distribution.

Species:
 Pterygoneurum californicum H.Crum, 1967
 Pterygoneurum chotticum Brotherus, 1902
 Pterygoneurum ovatum Dixon, 1934

References

Pottiaceae
Moss genera